Emperor is a Norwegian black metal band formed in 1991, regarded as highly influential by critics and emerging black metal bands. The group split up in 2001, but reunited from 2005 to 2007 for a few festival dates and brief US tours, and again reunited in 2013 to 2014. Emperor reformed for the third time in 2016. The group was founded by Ihsahn (guitar/vocal) and Samoth (then, drums).

History

Early career and In the Nightside Eclipse (1991–1995)
In their youth, Ihsahn and Samoth met at a rock music seminar. The two young men began playing together under various names; first Dark Device, then Xerasia, then Embryonic. The group soon evolved into the now well-known band Thou Shalt Suffer. Soon, however, Samoth began to write music outside of Thou Shalt Suffer, and together with Ihsahn and a new bass player called Mortiis (later of his own eponymous band Mortiis), Emperor was formed. After a short while together, the band released a demo entitled Wrath of the Tyrant. It quickly gained popularity in the underground and attracted the attention of the then-start-up label Candlelight. Soon afterwards, a record contract was signed, Samoth moved to rhythm guitar, Ihsahn continued the vocal duties and lead guitars, and Faust was recruited as a drummer. Emperor released their debut EP, Emperor, under Candlelight Records. The band then was signed to the infamous first black metal label, Deathlike Silence Productions, and planned to release their next album soon, though the band never managed to release any material while signed to DSP.

In the summer of 1992, a series of events were set in motion by the black metal inner circle. Samoth, along with various other black metallers, set out to burn down old churches in Norway. Also in 1992, Faust lived in Lillehammer, and in the newly constructed Olympic park a man named Magne Andreassen approached him and suggested that they take a walk in the nearby forest. Faust agreed, and, once in the forest, Faust claimed the man began to make strong sexual advances towards him. Faust then stabbed the man to death, kicking him in the head afterward to ensure that he was dead. He was not convicted until two years later. The day after Faust committed the murder, he went with Euronymous of Mayhem and Varg Vikernes of Burzum to burn the Holmenkollen Chapel in Oslo. In the summer of 1993, the band began working on their first full-length album. Emperor ceased wearing corpse paint; they stated that it was becoming a trend and losing its original significance and symbolism. In autumn of that year, the police began to investigate the murder of Euronymous of Mayhem, naming Varg Vikernes as a suspect; this investigation eventually led to the incarceration of Samoth for arson, and of Faust for the murder of Magne Andreassen.

In 1994, Samoth was sentenced to 16 months in prison for burning the Skjold Church in Vindafjord, together with Varg Vikernes. The arson was committed during a pause in the recording of the Burzum EP Aske (‘Ashes’). In 1994, In the Nightside Eclipse was released, and earned Emperor widespread acclaim and a large fanbase.

Final releases (1996–2001)
After Samoth's parole, the band was joined by Trym and Alver on drums and bass respectively, and at the end of 1996, Emperor entered the studio to record Anthems to the Welkin at Dusk. Anthems to the Welkin at Dusk won the 'album of the year' poll in many metal magazines around the world, including UK Terrorizer and US Metal Maniacs. Bassist Alver soon left.

Aside from their European shows, the band played in Mexico City on 24 July 1999.

Now continuing their career as a trio, with Ihsahn handling keyboards, vocals, guitars and bass, the band recorded their third album IX Equilibrium and toured Europe and North America. It was around 2000 when Samoth and Trym started to gravitate more towards death metal, while Ihsahn directed his musical exploration towards his side project, Peccatum. Thus, in 2001, Emperor decided to disband after releasing one final album, Prometheus: The Discipline of Fire & Demise, composed entirely by Ihsahn. Ihsahn later recalled that "When we announced the split up in 2001, we didn't think we would do anything more with Emperor ever again...The decision was also based on the feeling that Emperor had a lot of integrity, and that if we were going to end it, we should end it while we still created great music. For us, the decision was made in the black metal spirit. Since Samoth and I pulled in different directions, we didn't see any point in continuing. The core of the band wasn't intact anymore". Samoth echoed Ihsahn's position: "At that point, we both had other priorities that we wanted to pursue and we both felt that splitting up Emperor was the best thing to do. We really wanted to focus on other things, and felt it was the only right thing to do".

Hiatus and occasional live performances
Following the breakup, Samoth and Trym continued playing in the black/death metal outfit Zyklon, while Ihsahn concentrated on his family project Peccatum. Later Ihsahn announced a solo project, much in the vein of Prometheus: The Discipline of Fire & Demise and Peccatum, featuring drummer Asgeir Mickelson of Borknagar and Vintersorg. It has generated positive feedback in the black metal community.

The band played a surprise three-song show in Oslo on 30 September 2005, at which they announced a series of full concerts to take place in California, New York City, and Europe in 2006. As of February 2006, they were also scheduled to play at the Inferno festival in April and Germany's Wacken Open Air in August. Samoth was unable to take part in the US tour dates, as his conviction for the arson he committed in 1992 lengthened the process for his visa application, so Emperor performed without him.

On 7 October 2006, Emperor performed at the under-18 Motstøy-festival in their home town of Notodden. The band had wanted to do an under-18 gig and a gig at their home town, so the festival fit perfectly. It was held at a small venue called StuA, and with only 450 tickets available, the concert quickly sold out.

On 28 October 2006, Emperor returned to the UK to play a gig at London's Astoria venue, where the band was warmly greeted by fans. In 2007, Emperor played a series of one-off shows in the United States and two festival gigs in France and Finland.

A Tablature Book based on their Scattered Ashes: A Decade of Emperial Wrath compilation album, containing thirteen Emperor tracks from their back catalogue, transcribed by Ihsahn with a foreword also by him, was released 31 October 2007 via Candlelight Records. Emperor's albums were also re-issued in a special box version with a bonus poster on 21 August 2007.

Samoth announced on 23 October 2007 that Emperor had begun preparing a second official DVD release. On 8 December 2008 it was revealed that this release will be called Live Inferno and come in the form of a double-disc live album and a live DVD, taken from their appearances at Inferno and Wacken metal festivals during their brief reunion. It was released on 16 April 2009 in Europe and 21 April in North America.

On 2 August 2013, it was announced that Emperor would be reuniting to headline the 25th anniversary Wacken Festival in 2014. In the following months, they were announced as headliners for the 2014 editions of the Bloodstock Open Air and Hellfest festivals. In April 2014, they announced shows in Tokyo and Osaka for July with Trym playing drums due to Faust's visa issues.

On 12 August 2016, it was announced that Emperor would reunite again in 2017 for a special set of performances to celebrate their 20th anniversary second studio album Anthems to the Welkin at Dusk.

On 27 December 2018, the band announced its presentation at the Mexico Metal Fest in Monterrey, Mexico in 2019.

Despite playing a handful of reunion shows, Ihsahn has stated that Emperor has no plans to record a new album. He was quoted as saying: "It's kind of a lose-lose thing. The whole point of black metal, people want something that is real and has integrity of what it is. At this point, none of us can see any reason to do that beyond what we already do."

Controversy
In 1995, Ihsahn promoted arson in an interview: "Skjold Church was a large wooden church about 100 years old. The church contained an altar board and preaching chair from the 16th century. All this was said to be of historical, Christian value. So it was to be reduced to a pile of ashes. The material damages are set to be of 13 million Norwegian Kroners. The church was still being used by a large flock of blind followers. It became a victim for true Norwegian spirit on the 13th of September Anno 1992 during a stormy night. Witnessed by the moon, this symbolic act of anti-Christian war enlightened the night with pagan flames. Heathen barbarism is on the rise. We will bring back the forgotten past of strength, pride, and victory."

However, Ihsahn, in a post-1990s interview, attributed his ties to Satanism as being part of his adolescence.

In 2014, Emperor attracted further controversy when the original drummer, Faust, joined them for live performances. Faust is a convicted murderer and caused some upset by being part of the shows.

Band members

Current lineup
Ihsahn – vocals, guitars, keyboards 
Samoth – guitars , drums 
Trym Torson – drums

Former members
Håvard "Mortiis" Ellefsen – bass 
Bård "Faust" Eithun – drums 
Terje "Tchort" Schei – bass 
Jonas "Alver" Alver – bass

Live members
Current
Tony "Secthdamon" Ingebrigtsen – bass, backing vocals 
Jørgen Munkeby - keyboards, backing vocals 
Former
Vidar "Ildjarn" Våer – bass  
Steinar "Sverd" Johnsen – keyboards 
 Joachim "Charmand Grimloch" Rygg – keyboards 
Jan Erik "Tyr" Torgersen – bass 
Einar Solberg – keyboards, backing vocals 
Gerlioz - keyboards 
Ole Vistnes - bass

Timeline

Discography

Studio albums
 In the Nightside Eclipse (1994)
 Anthems to the Welkin at Dusk (1997)
 IX Equilibrium (1999)
 Prometheus: The Discipline of Fire & Demise (2001)

References

External links

 Official website

Norwegian black metal musical groups
Norwegian symphonic black metal musical groups
Musical groups established in 1991
1991 establishments in Norway
Musical groups disestablished in 2001
2001 disestablishments in Norway
Musical groups reestablished in 2016
Norwegian musical trios
Century Media Records artists
Musical groups from Notodden
Candlelight Records artists